KTAB-TV (channel 32) is a television station in Abilene, Texas, United States, affiliated with CBS and Telemundo. It is owned by Nexstar Media Group, which provides certain services to NBC affiliate KRBC-TV (channel 9) under joint sales and shared services agreements (JSA/SSA) with Mission Broadcasting. Both stations share studios on South 14th Street in western Abilene, while KTAB-TV's transmitter is located on Texas State Highway 36 in neighboring Callahan County.

History
KTAB began broadcasting on October 6, 1979. This made Abilene one of the last markets in the country to get full service from the "Big Three" networks.

Upon signing-on, it took over the CBS affiliation from KTXS-TV (channel 12), which became a full ABC affiliate. The station was founded by William "Bill" Terry (55% owner) and a large contingent of partners, investors, and department heads. Terry had worked for many years at established station KRBC-TV and was well known in the Abilene area. Terry sold the station to International Broadcasting, owned by stockholder Thomas Scallen in 1984.

Shamrock Broadcasting, Roy E. Disney's broadcasting company, bought the station in 1986. Shamrock then sold KTAB to Shooting Star Broadcasting in 1997. Current owner Nexstar Broadcasting Group bought the station from Shooting Star Broadcasting in 1999.

In 2005, Nexstar completed the consolidation of the KTAB operations into the older, larger KRBC building at 4510 South 14th Street in Abilene. Nexstar had already taken over KRBC's operations a year earlier under a joint sales agreement with KTAB as the senior partner. The original KTAB building was sold and has subsequently been converted into an office building. The computerized and automated master control facility not only operates KTAB and KRBC in Abilene, but also sister Nexstar/Mission stations KLST and KSAN-TV in San Angelo. All syndicated programming and local advertising for the four stations is delivered via Harris/Leitch Nexio servers with Avid/Sundance FastBreak automation providing all switching and playback operations. Business and traffic operations for all four stations are also handled here.

In December 2007, Nexstar Broadcasting set up a dual-path fiber-optic cable link to the San Angelo broadcast facility.

In May 2007, KTAB and KRBC's websites were combined into one, BigCountryHomepage.com. The site is maintained with content produced by both stations, and serves as a community portal to Abilene and the surrounding areas.

In 2014, KTAB added Telemundo to its 32.2 digital subchannel a few years after low-power station KTES-LP dropped the network in 2010 to join This TV.

News operation

KTAB presently broadcasts 19 hours of locally produced newscasts each week (with 3½ hours each weekday, one hour on Saturdays and a half-hour on Sundays); the station also produces an additional five hours of newscasts in Spanish each week (with one hour each weekday) for its Telemundo-affiliated second digital subchannel.

On February 2, 2013, KRBC began broadcasting the news in 16:9 widescreen with a new set and new graphics becoming the second station to make the switch. The newscasts on KTAB were included in the upgrade. On August 29, 2016, the station began broadcasting its newscasts in high definition, becoming the last station in the market to make the upgrade.

Technical information

Subchannels
The station's digital signal is multiplexed:

Installation of full-power digital transmitters for both KTAB-DT and KRBC-DT was completed in October 2007. The transmitters are housed in a newly constructed building at the KTAB tower site, adjacent to the former analog transmitter building on a mountaintop southeast of Potosi. Both stations share the same digital antenna on the KTAB tower. A new digital 7 GHz microwave studio-transmitter link (STL), as well as a master control update, has allowed both stations to deliver the high definition signals to the entire coverage area, as well as delivering Dolby Digital 5.1 audio. Both CBS and NBC networks use the 1080i HDTV format.

Both KTAB and KRBC operate digital microwave links in the 7 GHz and 2 GHz spectrums.

On June 15, 2016, Nexstar announced that it had entered into an affiliation agreement with Katz Broadcasting for the Escape, Laff, Grit, and Bounce TV networks (the last one of which is owned by Bounce Media LLC, whose COO Jonathan Katz is president/CEO of Katz Broadcasting), bringing one or more of the four networks to 81 stations owned and/or operated by Nexstar, including KTAB-TV and KRBC-TV.

Analog-to-digital conversion
KTAB-TV shut down its analog signal, over UHF channel 32, on May 12, 2009. The station's digital signal remained on its pre-transition UHF channel 24. Through the use of PSIP, digital television receivers display the station's virtual channel as its former UHF analog channel 32.

References

External links
Official website

TAB-TV
CBS network affiliates
Telemundo network affiliates
Ion Television affiliates
Ion Mystery affiliates
Television channels and stations established in 1979
1979 establishments in Texas
Nexstar Media Group